Pitta Pitta (also known under several other spellings) is an extinct Australian Aboriginal language. It was spoken around Boulia, Queensland.

Pituri
The name pituri for the leaves chewed as a stimulant by traditional Aboriginal people has been claimed to be derived from the Pitta Pitta word . though Walter Roth pointed out in 1897 that the word 'pituri', thus pronounced, was the term used by the neighbouring Yurlayurlanya people, and added that the Pitta Pitta people called it "tarembola".

Status
In 1979, Barry J. Blake reported that Pitta Pitta was "virtually extinct", with only three speakers remaining – Ivy Nardoo of Boulia, Ted Marshall and Linda Craigie of Mount Isa. It is now considered unlikely that any speakers remain.

Phonology

Vowels

Consonants

Sign language
The Pitta Pitta had well-developed a signed form of their language.

References

Blake, Barry J. (1979). Pitta-Pitta. In R.M.W. Dixon and Barry Blake (eds.), Handbook of Australian Languages, Vol. 1. 183–244. Amsterdam: John Benjamins.

 Roth, Walter E. (1897). The expression of ideas by manual signs: a sign-language. (p. 273–301) Reprinted from Roth, W.E. Ethnological studies among the North-West-Central Queensland Aborigines. London, Queensland Agent-Generals Information Office, 1897; 71–90; Information collected from the following tribes; Pitta-Pitta, Boinji, Ulaolinya, Wonkajera, Walookera, Undekerebina, Kalkadoon, Mitakoodi, Woonamurra, Goa. Reprinted (1978) in Aboriginal sign languages of the Americas and Australia. New York: Plenum Press, vol. 2.

External links
Bibliography of Pitta Pitta people and language resources, at the Australian Institute of Aboriginal and Torres Strait Islander Studies

Karnic languages
Extinct languages of Queensland
Extinct sign languages